Mayilattam (Tamil: மயிலாட்டம்) is an artistic and religious form of dance performed in the Hindu temples of Tamil Nadu in reverence to Lord Subrahmanya.

Mayilattam performers wear costumes from head to toe like peacock with beak, that can be opened and closed using a thread, and perform specific dances. The performers dance on a tall piece of wood attached at the end of their feet. This art requires extensive training and practise. This dance is performed in all Murugan (Lord Subrahmanya) temples as a tradition during festivals. Due to the difficulties in practise and less amount of wages for the dancers, the number of Mayilattam performers is decreasing.

References 

Tamil dance styles